Edward Harold Hagen (born June 1, 1962) is an American biological anthropologist and professor in the Department of Anthropology at Washington State University Vancouver, where he has taught since 2007. His research has focused on evolutionary explanations for mental health phenomena and substance use. He has studied the Yanomamo people of Venezuela, West African Pygmies, and the Aka people of the Congo Basin.

References

External links
Faculty page

Living people
Physical anthropologists
21st-century American anthropologists
20th-century American anthropologists
Washington State University faculty
University of California, Berkeley alumni
University of California, Santa Barbara alumni
1962 births